The Blue-spotted dragonet (Callionymus caeruleonotatus) is a species of dragonet endemic to the waters around the Hawaiian Islands where it occurs at depths of from .  This species grows to a length of  SL.

References 

C
Fish described in 1905